Birgir Örn Birgisson (born 6 October 1969) is an Icelandic basketball coach and a former professional player who played 26 games for the Icelandic national basketball team. He won two national championships with Keflavík in 1997 and 1999. Before turning to basketball, Birgir had a successful career in swimming and was a member of the Icelandic national swimming team.

Basketball

Awards and achievements
Icelandic champion: 2
1997, 1999
Icelandic Division I: 1
1994
Icelandic Basketball Cup: 1
1997
Icelandic Supercup: 1
1997
Icelandic Company Cup: 3
1996, 1997, 1998

National team
Birgir played 26 games for the Icelandic national basketball team between 1995 and 2000.

Swimming

Awards and achievements
Icelandic Swim Cup: 1
1986

References

1969 births
Living people
Centers (basketball)
Forwards (basketball)
Birgir Orn Birgisson
Birgir Orn Birgisson
Birgir Orn Birgisson
Icelandic male swimmers
Keflavík men's basketball players
Birgir Orn Birgisson
UMFB Basketball players
Úrvalsdeild karla (basketball) coaches
Úrvalsdeild karla (basketball) players
Vestri men's basketball coaches
Vestri men's basketball players
Þór Akureyri men's basketball players